In the United States, the Multi-Use Radio Service (MURS) is a licensed by rule (i.e. under part 95, subpart J, of title 47, Code of Federal Regulations) two-way radio service similar to the Citizens band (CB). Established by the U.S. Federal Communications Commission in the fall of 2000, MURS created a radio service allowing for licensed by rule (Part 95) operation in a narrow selection of the VHF band, with a power limit of 2 watts. The FCC formally defines MURS as "a private, two-way, short-distance voice or data communications service for personal or business activities of the general public." MURS stations may not be connected to the public telephone network, may not be used for store and forward operations, and radio repeaters are not permitted.

In 2009, Industry Canada (IC) established a five-year transition plan, which would have permitted the use of MURS in Canada starting June 2014.  In August 2014 IC announced a deferral of MURS introduction, as "the Department does not feel that the introduction of MURS devices in Canada is warranted at this time, and has decided to defer the introduction of MURS devices in Canada until a clearer indication of actual need is provided by Canadian MURS advocates and/or stakeholders ..."

Eligibility 
No licenses are required or issued for MURS within the United States.
Any person is authorized to use the MURS frequencies given that it:
 Is not a foreign government or a representative of a foreign government.
 Uses the transmitter in accordance with 47 CFR. 95.1309.
 Operates in accordance with the rules contained in Sections 95.1301-95.1309.
 Operates only legal, type-accepted MURS equipment.

Frequencies 
MURS comprises the following five frequencies:

Channels 1–3 must use "narrowband" frequency modulation (2.5 kHz deviation; 11.25 kHz bandwidth). Channels 4 and 5 may use either "wideband" FM (5 kHz deviation; 20 kHz bandwidth) or "narrowband" FM.  All five channels may use amplitude modulation with a bandwidth up to 8 kHz.  MURS falls under part 95 and was not mandated for narrow-banding, such as those of Part 90 in the public service bands by January 2013.

Because previous business band licensees who have maintained their active license remain grandfathered with their existing operating privileges, it is possible to find repeaters or other operations not authorized by Part 95 taking place. These are not necessarily illegal. If legal, such operations may enjoy primary status on their licensed frequency and as such are legally protected from harmful interference by MURS users.

Range
MURS range will vary, depending on antenna size and placement.

Authorized modes

Permitted areas of operation
MURS operation is authorized anywhere a CB radio station is authorized and within or over any area of the world where radio services are regulated by the FCC. Those areas are within the territorial limits of:
 The fifty United States
 The District of Columbia
 American Samoa (seven islands)
 Baker Island
 Caribbean Insular areas
 Commonwealth of Northern Mariana Islands
 Commonwealth of Puerto Rico
 Guam Island
 Howland Island
 Jarvis Island
 Johnston Atoll (Islets East, Johnston, North and Sand)
 Kingman Reef
 Midway Atoll (Islets Eastern and Sand)
 Navassa Island
 Pacific Insular areas
 Palmyra Atoll (more than fifty islets)
 United States Virgin Islands (50 islets and cays)
 Wake Island
 Aboard any vessel of the United States, with the permission of the captain, while the vessel is traveling either domestically or in international waters

Restrictions
 Transmitter power output is limited to 2 watts.
 Transmitting on MURS frequencies is not allowed while aboard aircraft in flight.
 Devices that use MURS must be specially labeled and certified.

Products
There are a wide variety of radio products that use MURS frequencies. MURS devices include wireless base station intercoms, handheld two-way radios, wireless dog training collars, wireless public address units, customer service callboxes, wireless remote switches, and wireless callboxes with or without gate opening ability.

Since MURS uses standard frequencies, most devices that use MURS are compatible with each other.

Most analog two-way radios utilize a technology called CTCSS or DCS that helps block out unwanted transmissions. To make MURS two-way radios work together, they must have matching CTCSS or DCS tones. This can usually be done via basic programming which almost all MURS two-way radios support.

The goTenna, a digital radio product, operates on the MURS band and pairs with smartphones to enable users to send texts and share locations on a peer-to-peer basis.  goTenna is not interoperable with other MURS devices, even though they operate on the same spectrum, employing "listen-before-talk" to reduce interference in the band's five channels.

Notable users
According to Bill Fawcett's Spaniel Journal, Spaniel pro-handler Dan Langhans was given a set of VHF business-band radios on the frequency of 154.57 MHz which became known by the trade as "blue dot" radios.

Costco Wholesale use Motorola DTR600, DLR1020, and Motorola Curve on Frequency 1 for general use among employees and Frequency 2 for communication with major sales departments. Walmart and Sam's Club use a Motorola Solutions model Motorola RDM2070D, which is exclusive to Walmart and Sam's Club. The Motorola RDM2070D is preprogrammed on MURS frequencies with most channels using CTCSS tone 21/4Z/136.5Hz.

See also
 Business band
 Family Radio Service
 General Mobile Radio Service
 Public Radio Service
 Unlicensed Personal Communications Services

References

External links
 FCC Wireless Services: MURS Home
 MURS Rules Summary

Bandplans
Radio communications
Radio regulations